Ezra Hendrickson (born 16 January 1972) is a Vincentian professional football coach and former player. He is currently the head coach of Major League Soccer club Chicago Fire.

Born in Layou, Hendrickson moved with his family to the United States at a young age and played college soccer with the Drake Bulldogs. He began his senior career with semi-professional clubs Des Moines Menace and New Orleans Riverboat Gamblers before being drafted in the 1997 MLS Supplemental Draft by the NY/NJ MetroStars. He was cut midseason by the MetroStars before joining the Los Angeles Galaxy. While with the Galaxy, Hendrickson formed part of the defense that would go on to win the Supporters' Shield in 1998 and then both the Shield and MLS Cup in 2002. In 2003, Hendrickson was traded by the Galaxy to the Dallas Burn.

Following the 2003 season, Hendrickson joined A-League club Charleston Battery before quickly moving back to Major League Soccer, joining D.C. United. With D.C. United, Hendrickson won his second MLS Cup but was an unused substitute during the match. He then moved to Chivas USA before joining the Columbus Crew in 2006. Hendrickson ended his playing career in 2008, winning both his third MLS Cup and second Supporters' Shield. He was also capped 36 times for the Saint Vincent and the Grenadines national team, scoring two goals internationally.

In 2009, Hendrickson began his coaching career, joining Major League Soccer expansion club Seattle Sounders FC as an assistant to his former head coach, Sigi Schmid. While an assistant, he would often coach the club's reserve side, finally becoming the first head coach of their professional reserve affiliate, Seattle Sounders FC 2, in 2015. While coaching with Sounders FC 2, Hendrickson was also an assistant with the Vincentian national team. He left both roles in 2018, returning as an assistant to Sigi Schmid with the LA Galaxy. From 2019 to 2021, he joined the Columbus Crew as an assistant to Caleb Porter before being announced as the head coach of the Chicago Fire for the 2022 season.

Early life
Hendrickson was born in Layou, St. Vincent. He played club soccer and varsity basketball at Western High School in Russiaville, Indiana. He then played college soccer at Drake University from 1990 to 1993, where he was named all-Missouri Valley Conference three times, and was named an NSCAA third team All-American as a senior.

Upon graduating, Hendrickson joined the amateur Des Moines Menace in 1994, where he played striker, scoring 13 goals in his first year. After a season with the Menace, Hendrickson was signed to a professional contract by the New Orleans Riverboat Gamblers of the USISL. Hendrickson played for the Riverboat Gamblers, and was named Select League Defender of the Year in 1996.

Professional career
After his exceptional 1996 season, Hendrickson was drafted 5th overall in the 1997 MLS Supplemental Draft by the New York/New Jersey MetroStars, for whom he played eight matches in 1997. During his time with NY/NJ, fans gave him the nickname 'The Caribbean Beckenbauer'. Midseason, Hendrickson was cut and picked up by the Los Angeles Galaxy, where he solidified his role as a starter, and earn a reputation as one of the best wing backs in MLS. After seven seasons with the Galaxy, Hendrickson was traded to the Dallas Burn in 2003.

When the Burn reorganised the team following their 2003 campaign, Hendrickson found himself without a team in MLS, and briefly signed with the Charleston Battery of the A-League. However, not long into the 2004 season, D.C. United acquired him to play a backup role in their central defence. Hendrickson was selected fifth overall by C.D. Chivas USA in the Expansion Draft after the season. After a year with Chivas, he was on a move again, sent to Columbus early in the 2006 season. He retired after helping the Crew to its first MLS title during the 2008 season.

International
Hendrickson also spent time as the captain of the Saint Vincent and the Grenadines national team, and was one of the team's best players since earning his first cap in 1995 against Barbados. He made 24 appearances for Saint Vincent and the Grenadines in the 1998, 2002, and 2006 World Cup qualifiers and 123 overall, scoring twice during a  1996 Caribbean Cup match against Haiti on 27 May 1996.

Coaching career
After retiring, Hendrickson joined the staff of Seattle Sounders FC, working as an assistant to his former coach, Sigi Schmid. After managing the Sounders reserves for several seasons, he was named head coach for Seattle Sounders FC 2 upon the club's entry into the United Soccer League.

Chicago Fire
On 24 November 2021, Hendrickson was appointed head coach at Major League Soccer club Chicago Fire from the 2022 season.

Coaching statistics

Honours

Player
Los Angeles Galaxy
 CONCACAF: Champions Cup 2000
 MLS Cup: 2002
 Supporters' Shield: 1998, 2002

D.C. United
 MLS Cup: 2004

Columbus Crew
 MLS Cup: 2008
 Supporters' Shield: 2008

Individual
 USISL Select League Defender of the Year: 1996

References

External links

1972 births
Living people
Charleston Battery players
Chivas USA players
Columbus Crew players
Expatriate soccer players in the United States
FC Dallas players
D.C. United players
Des Moines Menace players
Drake Bulldogs men's soccer players
LA Galaxy players
Major League Soccer players
New York Red Bulls players
New Orleans Riverboat Gamblers players
Saint Vincent and the Grenadines expatriate sportspeople in the United States
Saint Vincent and the Grenadines footballers
Saint Vincent and the Grenadines expatriate footballers
Saint Vincent and the Grenadines international footballers
1996 CONCACAF Gold Cup players
USISL players
A-League (1995–2004) players
USL Second Division players
USISL Select League players
New York Red Bulls draft picks
Seattle Sounders FC non-playing staff
Association football defenders
People from Saint Andrew Parish, Saint Vincent and the Grenadines
Tacoma Defiance coaches
Saint Vincent and the Grenadines football managers
Saint Vincent and the Grenadines expatriate football managers
Columbus Crew non-playing staff
LA Galaxy non-playing staff
People from Howard County, Indiana
Soccer players from Indiana